Siniša Mikuličić (born 16 October 1983  in Rijeka) is a Croatian sailor, who specialized in the Star class. He achieved his best results in the Star class, by finishing twelfth at the 2008 Star World Championships in Miami, Florida, along with his partner Marin Lovrović, Jr.

Mikulicic represented Croatia at the 2008 Summer Olympics in Beijing, where he competed as a crew sailor for the Star class. He and his partner Lovrovic finished fifteenth at the end of ten preliminary races, with a net score of 98 points.

References

External links
 
 
 
 
 

1983 births
Living people
Croatian male sailors (sport)
Olympic sailors of Croatia
Sailors at the 2008 Summer Olympics – Star
Sportspeople from Rijeka